Shush may refer to:
Shush, Iran, a city in Iran
Shush-e Olya, a village in Iran
Shush-e Sofla, a village in Iran
Susa, which is Shush in Persian
Shush County, Iran
Istgah-e Shush, a village and railway station in Iran
Shush Metro Station, a station on Tehran Metro Line 1
S.H.U.S.H., the fictional peace-keeping organization

See also
Shushtar